The German Youth Hostel Association or DJH is a not-for-profit, registered association (eingetragener Verein). It was founded in 1919 to create an organized network of affordable and safe accommodation away from home for travelling school and youth groups and individuals all over the country. Today, the 438 youth hostels in the association still cater to school and youth groups but are also open to anyone else looking for an alternative to hotels - families, backpackers, business travellers, etc. Through the state (Bundesland) associations it is the representative of the 438 youth hostels in Germany (as at 2021) and thus the largest member of the international youth association, Hostelling International (HI). The headquarters has its seat in Detmold and is divided into 14 state associations and 178 local and county volunteer associations. It has about 2,38 million members.

The German Youth Hostel Association is a member of the European Movement Germany.

DJH Membership 

Membership of the German Youth Hostel Association is a prerequisite for an overnight stay in a hostel in Germany. Abroad, DJH members can stay in hostels that are associated with Hostelling International and may be entitled to discounts there. DJH membership is obtained through the state association responsible for each residence. In addition, organizations such as clubs or schools may apply for corporate membership.
The membership fee is due once a year.

History 

By the end of the 1920s, there were over 2,300 Youth Hostels across Germany. These Hostels clearly didn’t compare to today’s standards. Often, they were no more than straw beds in “makeshift shelters,” located, for instance, in village schools that were closed for the holidays. Today, the German Youth Hostel Association runs about 438 hostels.

The DJH was merged into the Hitler Youth in 1933 until the end of the Second World War. In 1949 it was re-founded at Altena Castle in North Rhine-Westphalia.

As a result of the travel restrictions and accommodation bans imposed in the wake of the coronavirus pandemic, all DJH Youth Hostels had to cease operations in spring 2020. The only exceptions were those hostels that could accommodate guests for absolutely necessary purposes or that had been converted for temporary special use (accommodation for the homeless, fever ambulance, women's shelter, etc.). In 2019, the DJH, with its around 450 Youth Hostels in 14 DJH regional associations, was able to record around 10 million overnight stays. In 2020, it was only a little more than 3.6 million - a significant decline of 63 percent. The non-profit association was hit particularly hard by the almost complete loss of school trips and other group stays, which had previously been the largest guest groups at the DJH. The strongest guest groups in the possible travel season in 2020 were families (many of whom discovered youth hostels as holiday destinations for the first time).

Educational programmes 

One of the aims behind Richard Schirrmann’s idea, apart from providing youngsters who were exploring the countryside on foot with a simple and inexpensive place to stay for the night, was teaching them about the great outdoors they were venturing into and raising awareness for the environment, the vegetation and wildlife around them. This educational aspect of the hostelling idea is one that the Youth Hostels continue to take just as seriously as its other values – tolerance, international understanding and open-mindedness

References

Further reading 
 
 Jürgen Reulecke; Barbara Stambolis: 100 Jahre Jugendherbergen 1909–2009. Anfänge – Wandlungen – Rück- und Ausblicke. Klartext Verlag, Essen, 2009,

External links 
 English website of the DJH

Backpacking
Hostelling International member associations
Youth organizations established in 1909
Non-profit organisations based in North Rhine-Westphalia
Charities based in Germany
Detmold